Agugliano is a comune (municipality) in the Province of Ancona in the Italian region Marche, located about  southwest of Ancona.

Agugliano borders the following municipalities: Ancona, Camerata Picena, Jesi, Polverigi.

References

External links
 Official website

Cities and towns in the Marche
Articles which contain graphical timelines